St Chad’s Church, Rubery is a Church of England parish church in Rubery, Worcestershire.

History

The church evolved in 1895 as a mission church from Holy Trinity Church, Lickey. The first building was a small wooden church. The wooden church comprised a nave only, with campanile tower at the west end, tiled with shingles, the roof with red and blue tiles. It accommodated 300 persons and cost £530. The architects were W. Jeffery Hopkins and A.B. Pinckney.

A parish was assigned out of Holy Trinity Church, Lickey in 1933.

The Second World War prevented progress on building a new church, but this was started in 1957 to designs by the architect Richard Twentyman and completed in 1959. Nikolaus Pevsner describes the building as a fine Modernist example.

Organ

An organ from St Margaret’s Church, Ladywood was transferred here when St Margaret’s Church closed. A specification of the organ can be found on the National Pipe Organ Register.

References

Church of England church buildings in Worcestershire
Churches completed in 1959
Richard Twentyman